Poppy Kelly (born 10 December 1998) is an Australian rules footballer who plays for Richmond in the AFL Women's (AFLW). She has previously played for St Kilda.

AFLW career

St Kilda
Kelly joined St Kilda for their inaugural season in the 2020 AFL Women's season.

Richmond
After two seasons at St Kilda, Kelly was traded to Richmond in exchange for pick no. 48 ahead of the 2022 AFL Women's season.

Statistics
Statistics are correct to round 3, 2022

|- style="background-color: #eaeaea"
! scope="row" style="text-align:center" | 2020
|style="text-align:center;"|
| 16 || 3 || 0 || 0 || 12 || 15 || 27 || 5 || 8 || 0.0 || 0.0 || 4.0 || 5.0 || 9.0 || 1.7 || 2.7
|- 
| scope="row" style="text-align:center" | 2021
|style="text-align:center;"|
| 16 || 3 || 0 || 0 || 2 || 18 || 20 || 1 || 13 || 0.0 || 0.0 || 0.7 || 6.0 || 6.7 || 0.3 || 4.3
|- style="background:#EAEAEA"
| scope="row" text-align:center | 2022
| 
| 14 || 1 || 0 || 0 || 2 || 3 || 5 || 2 || 1 || 0.0 || 0.0 || 2.0 || 3.0 || 5.0 || 2.0 || 1.0
|-
|- class="sortbottom"
! colspan=3| Career
! 7
! 0
! 0
! 16
! 36
! 52
! 8
! 22
! 0.0
! 0.0
! 2.3
! 5.1
! 7.4
! 1.1
! 3.1
|}

References

External links
 
 

Living people
1998 births
St Kilda Football Club (AFLW) players
Australian rules footballers from Victoria (Australia)
Sportswomen from Victoria (Australia)
Richmond Football Club (AFLW) players